Juan Díaz is an American former professional tennis player.

Díaz was raised in Cuba, where he was the nation's top ranked junior in 1968 and 1969.

Moving to Tampa, Florida in 1969, Díaz played on the varsity team for the University of Florida and was SEC champion at No. 1 singles in 1975, as well as a three-time All-SEC.

After graduating from college in 1975 he competed briefly on tour, reaching a best singles world ranking of 310. He made a main draw appearance as a qualifier at the 1976 US Open.

References

External links
 
 

Year of birth missing (living people)
Living people
American male tennis players
Cuban emigrants to the United States
Florida Gators men's tennis players
American sportspeople of Cuban descent
Tennis people from Florida